ntfsresize is a free Unix utility that non-destructively resizes the NTFS filesystem used by Windows NT 4.0, 2000, XP, 2003, Vista, 7, 8, 10, and 11 typically on a hard-disk partition. All NTFS versions used by 32-bit and 64-bit Windows are supported. No defragmentation is required prior to resizing since version 1.11.2. ntfsresize is included in the ntfsprogs package, developed by the Linux-NTFS project. For those that don't have a Unix system installed, it is still possible to run ntfsresize by using one of the many Linux Live CDs.

ntfsresize features
 Full compatibility with all known NTFS versions from Windows NT 3.1 to Windows Vista
 Checks internal structures for errors
 Will work in various difficult situations:
 No defragmentation needed prior to use
 Supports both shrinking and expanding NTFS
 Supports resizing volumes with known bad sectors in them
 Will refuse to run under certain conditions:
 When the volume is flagged dirty, that is marked for Windows to run CHKDSK at boot. The  switch will override this
 When Windows is hibernated on the partition

See also
 ntfsprogs

External links 
ntfsresize man
ntfsresize homepage 
Download page at sourceforge

Free storage software
Free partitioning software
Linux file system-related software